Søren Ulrik Vestergaard (born May 4, 1987) is a Danish former professional football player.

He came to Randers FC from Silkeborg IF, and his transfer was set to January 1, 2008, where his contract expired, but Randers and Silkeborg came to an agreement about the transfer sum on June 21, 2007.

In the spring of 2008 he was lend to Viborg FF and from July 1 he will join them permanently.

Søren Ulrik Vestergaard graduated from Silkeborg Amtsgymnasium (now known as Silkeborg Gymnasium) in 2005.

He retired on July 19, 2010, due to wishes of a career outside football.

External links
Danish national team profile
Career stats at Danmarks Radio

Living people
1987 births
Danish men's footballers
Denmark under-21 international footballers
Silkeborg IF players
Randers FC players
Viborg FF players
Danish Superliga players
Association football forwards
People from Silkeborg Municipality
Sportspeople from the Central Denmark Region